This is an article showing the matches of Real Betis in European competitions.

Overall record
Accurate as of 16 March 2023

Source: UEFA.comPld = Matches played; W = Matches won; D = Matches drawn; L = Matches lost; GF = Goals for; GA = Goals against; GD = Goal Difference.

Results

External links
 Official website 
 Real Betis at La Liga 
 Real Betis at UEFA 

Europe
Spanish football clubs in international competitions